Paraterellia immaculata is a species of tephritid or fruit flies in the genus Paraterellia of the family Tephritidae.

References

Trypetinae